Pala State assembly constituency is one of the 140 state legislative assembly constituencies in Kerala state in southern India. It is also one of the 7 state legislative assembly constituencies included in the Kottayam Lok Sabha constituency. As of the 2021 assembly elections, the current MLA is Mani C. Kappan of Nationalist Congress Kerala.

Local self governed segments
Pala Niyama Sabha constituency is composed of the following local self governed segments:

Members of Legislative Assembly
The following list contains all members of Kerala legislative assembly who have represented Pala Niyama Sabha Constituency during the period of various assemblies:

Key

  

 * Byepoll

Election results
Percentage change (±%) denotes the change in the number of votes from the immediate previous election.

Niyamasabha Election 2021
There were 1,84,857 registered voters in the constituency for the 2021 election.

Niyamasabha by-election 2019
Due to the death of sitting MLA K. M. Mani in April 2019, Pala went to bypoll on 23 September 2019.

There were 1,79,107 registered voters in Pala Constituency for the 2019 Kerala Niyamasabha by-election.

Niyamasabha Election 2016 
There were 1,80,091 registered voters in the constituency for the 2016 Kerala Niyamasabha Election.

Niyamasabha Election 2011 
There were 1,69,192 registered voters in the constituency for the 2011 election.

See also
 Pala
 Kottayam district
 List of constituencies of the Kerala Legislative Assembly
 2016 Kerala Legislative Assembly election
 2019 Kerala Legislative Assembly by-elections

References

Assembly constituencies of Kerala
State assembly constituencies in Kottayam district